The 13575/13576 Tambaram–Jasidih Junction Ratna Weekly Express (formerly Chennai Central–Asansol Ratna Express) is a Express train of the Indian Railways connecting  in Tamil Nadu and Jasidih Junction in Jharkhand. It is currently being operated with 13575/13576 train numbers on a weekly basis.

Service

The 13575/Tambaram–Jasidih Junction Ratna Weekly Express  has an average speed of 56 km/hr and covers 1872 km in 33 hrs 25 mins. 13576/Jasidih Junction–Tambaram Ratna Weekly Express  has an average speed of 54 km/hr and covers 1872 km in 34 hrs 45 mins.

Route & Halts 

The important halts of the train are:

 
 Chennai Egmore
 
 Eluru
 
 
 
 
 
 
 
 
 
  (Adra alternative)
Asansol Junction

Coach composition

The train has newly manufacturef LHB  rakes with max speed of 110 kmph. The train consists of 22 coaches :

 1 AC II Tier
 6 AC III Tier
 10 Sleeper Coaches
 2 General Unreserved
 1 Pantry Car
 2 End On Generator Cars (EOG)

Traction

Both trains are hauled by an Erode shed-based WAP-4 electric locomotive from Tambaram to Visakhapatnam, from Visakhapatnam it is hauled by a Tatanagar shed based WAP-7 locomotive up to Asansol and from Asansol to Jasidih by a Howrah shed based WAP-7 locomotive and vice versa.

Direction reversal

The train reverses its direction 1 times:

 
 Asansol Junction

See also 

 Chennai Central
 Asansol Junction railway station
 Indore–Pune Superfast Express

Notes

References

External links 

 12375/Chennai Central – Asansol (Ratna) SF Express 
 12376/Asansol – Chennai Central (Ratna) SF Express

Transport in Chennai
Transport in Asansol
Express trains in India
Rail transport in Tamil Nadu
Rail transport in Andhra Pradesh
Rail transport in Odisha
Rail transport in Jharkhand
Rail transport in West Bengal
Railway services introduced in 2012
Named passenger trains of India